Humberto Ceballos Boza (born Panama City, July 25, 1997), better known by his stage name Boza, is a Panamanian singer and songwriter. He began his career in 2014 by venturing into urban music. His style is characterized by the fusion between the dancehall and Regé genres with the Panamanian style "canela".

Biography 

El Boza has commented that since childhood he had an interest in football, and wanted to perform as a professional footballer. However, for various reasons he decided to go into music. In his childhood he used to sing to his friends on top of an old refrigerator, and they were amazed by his musical qualities and decided to tell a music producer about him. He rose to fame in Panama in 2015 with the song "Bandolera" along with the also Panamanian singers Yemil and El Tachi.

Career 
Boza started his music career in 2014, when he was just 16 years old. His first song was "Canelas", but his popularity was ignited with "Bandolera", a collaboration with Panamanian singers Yemil and Tachi. He was one of the fresh faces of the new wave of Panamanians that with dancehall, reggae in Spanish, trap and explicit content flowed in a musical category that they called "canela". They were immediately criticized by artists from the past and tried to censor them, as is often the case with sounds created by a young generation. The Chombo legendary figure of Latin music is one of the main detractors of "canela".

In April 2017, he joined the record label Panama Music, led by Januario Crespo, who signed the rights to represent the idol. In the following years, he released songs such as "Ratas y ratones", "Lollipop" and "Me mató", which allowed him to obtain international recognition. This musical credit goes to Panamanian record producer Irving Quintero "Faster", who asserts that the artist will continue to maintain his essence, confirming the talent and versatility he possesses when it comes to interpretation. In April 2019, he signed with Sony Music Latin, thus becoming the first Panamanian artist to sign with the record company.

In June 2019, he announced that his debut album was in development. In September of the same year, he released the first single from the album entitled "En 4 Vente". In February 2020, Boza released his debut extended play, Sonrisas Tristes, which includes the single "Party en mi Casa", which peaked at number three in Panama. Later, on July 31, 2020, Boza released his debut studio album, Más Negro que Rojo, which includes the songs "Bandida", which became Boza's highest-charting single in Panama, debuting at number two; and "Hecha Pa' Mi", that became a commercial success in Latin America, Europe and the United States, after earning popularity on the video-sharing app TikTok.

Controversy 
In January 2020, the singer starred in an altercation on Twitter after a follower hinted at the male artist to which he responded with a macho and even homophobic tone.

Discography

Albums

Extended plays

Singles

As a lead artist

As a featured artist

References

21st-century Panamanian male singers
21st-century Panamanian singers
Panamanian reggaeton musicians
Sony BMG artists
People from Panama City
1997 births
Living people